Calvin Jackson may refer to:
 Calvin Jackson (pianist) (1919–1985), American jazz pianist, composer, and bandleader
 Calvin Jackson (drummer) (1961–2015), American drummer
 Calvin Jackson (American football) (1972–2021), American football defensive back 
 Calvin Jackson (serial killer) (born 1948), American serial killer and rapist